Cotwall End Valley is a local nature reserve in West Midlands, England. It is about a mile south of Sedgley, in the Metropolitan Borough of Dudley.

It incorporates some of the grounds of Ellowes Hall, a stately home built in the early 19th century and demolished in 1964, which has led to the wooded part of the valley being known locally as "Ellowes Hall Wood".

Description
It was declared a local nature reserve (LNR) by Dudley Metropolitan Borough Council in 1990. It is also a Site of Importance for Nature Conservation. The reserve, area , contains grassland, woodland including ancient woodland, and lowland heath. Some of the flora and fauna is rare nationally.

Geology
The valley is on two branches of a major geological fault at the edge of the South Staffordshire coalfield, and so there is great geological diversity. These features, meeting the criteria specified by the Global Geoparks Network, make it a geosite within the Black Country Geopark.

References

External links
 Countryside walks in Dudley: Cotwall End Valley (leaflet)

Local Nature Reserves in the West Midlands (county)
Forests and woodlands of the West Midlands (county)
Parks and open spaces in the West Midlands (county)
Geology of the West Midlands (county)
Metropolitan Borough of Dudley